The following are units which operated the Lockheed P-38 Lightning:

Operators

Australia
Royal Australian Air Force
The RAAF received five F-4s from August 31, 1942.  These aircraft were used for frontline photoreconnaissance sorties. Three served with No. 1 Photo Reconnaissance Unit RAAF and two were attached to a fighter unit, No. 75 Squadron RAAF. The first to enter service with the RAAF, A55-1 was also the last to retire, following a crash on September 1, 1944.

China
Chinese Nationalist Air Force
Republic of China received 15 P-38Js and P-38Ls and, postwar, they also flew a similar number of F-5Es and F-5Gs.

Colombia
Geographic Institute Agustín Codazzi

Dominican Republic
The first P-38 of the Compañía de Aviación Air army arrived in Santiago on 30 March 1947. It was its first modern aircraft. The air force of this small Latin American republic employed 11 Lightnings, mostly not armed.
Dominican Republic was one of the last P-38's users until late 1950, when the remaining Lightings were  cut up and dumped.

Free France
Free French Air Force
Group 2/23 operated F-5As
French Air Force
Groupe de Reconnaissance 2/33 operated the F-5G

Nazi Germany
Luftwaffe
Zirkus Rosarius operated a few captured aircraft.

Honduras
Honduran Air Force
Honduras received 12 aircraft postwar.

Kingdom of Italy
Regia Aeronautica
Italian pilots started to face P-38s from late 1942 and these fighters, with their long range, high speed and powerful weaponry, were quickly established as a more dangerous foe than the previously used Supermarine Spitfire. A few P-38s fell into the hands of Germans and Italians, and, differently from captured Spitfires, these aircraft were tested and used in combat. P-38s were pitted against nearly all of the fighters in the Italian arsenal in tests at Guidonia and apparently, it fared well. Col. Tondi used a P-38, probably an 'E' version, that landed, because a navigation error, in Sardinia. Tondi then claimed at least 1 B-24 in his captured P-38, downed 11 August 1943. Shortly before Tondi attacked the bomber, an Italian Macchi MC.202 or 205 attacked, doing little damage. However, the heavy armament of P-38 proved devastating, indeed.
Italian Co-Belligerent Air Force
3° Aerobrigata RT
4° Aerobrigata
After capitulation, the Italian Co-Belligerent Air Force flew F-5A photo-reconnaissance missions. The Italian Air Force operated 50 late model aircraft postwar.

Italy
Italian Air Force
3° Stormo
4° Stormo
After the war, Italy received 100, or according to other sources, 120, dismantled ex-USAAF P-38s, in an agreement dated April 1946. Seven of these airframes were not rebuilt but were reserved for use as spares. The remaining 93, after a one-month refurbishment by IMM (Aerfer), were first issued to the 3rd Stormo in Bari and Lecce, in Apulia. They were a mix of P-38L fighters and PR conversions, including F-5E, G and H models. Six P-38s were modified as dual-control training craft, a version which had a separate cockpit with duplicated controls forward of the standard cockpit, in a lengthened nose. These unique training machines, which served with the SCOT (Scuola Caccia Ogni Tempo, meaning fighter school for all weather conditions) in Lecce and Foggia, were identified as P-38DC (Dual Control).
The heavy fighters flew reconnaissance missions over the Balkans, as well as ground attack, naval cooperation and air superiority missions. 
Italian P-38s made their operational debut  on 9 September 1948, when a single F-5 took photographs of objectives in the Balkans.
Because of the big dimensions of this fighter, the old engines, and pilot errors, a very high number of P-38s were lost in accidents. At least thirty crashes of P-38s in Italian service claimed a number of victims. Despite this, many Italian pilots liked the fighter, due to its excellent visibility on the ground and its stability at takeoff. The P-38s were finally phased-out in Italy in 1956. Today, no Italian P-38s survive, nor even a single component from one, as these aircraft, because of the high value of their light alloys, were quickly recycled for their metal content.

Portugal
Portuguese Air Force
Two interned Lightnings were forced to land in Lisbon, Portugal, while on a ferry flight from England to Algeria. Both were used by PoAF.

Soviet Union
Soviet Air Force
Soviet Union operated a few damaged and repaired ex-USAAF aircraft found in Eastern Europe.

United Kingdom
Royal Air Force
The United Kingdom performed evaluation tests only.

United States
United States Air Force
United States Army Air Forces
United States Navy

See also

Lockheed XP-49
Lockheed XP-58 Chain Lightning

References
Notes

Bibliography
 Scutts, Jerry. Lockheed P-38 Lightning. London: Crowood, 2006. .

Lists of military units and formations by aircraft
P-38 Lightning
Lockheed aircraft